Covert Warfare:  Intelligence, Counterintelligence and Military Deception During the World War II Era is an eighteen volume book edited by John Mendelsohn and published in 1989 by Garland.
The series contains sanitized versions of selected previously classified documents from the National Archives record groups.

 Library of Congress Classification: D810.S7 (D810S7C66)
 Dewey Decimal Classification: 940.5485

Volumes

References

 GVK - Common Union Catalogue
 

Counter Intelligence Corps
Non-fiction books about espionage
1989 non-fiction books